Presidential, legislative and local elections were held on November 11, 1969, in the Philippines. Incumbent President Ferdinand Marcos won an unprecedented second full term as President of the Philippines. Marcos was the last president in the entire electoral history who ran and won for a second term. His running mate, incumbent Vice President Fernando Lopez was also elected to a third full term as Vice President of the Philippines. An unprecedented twelve candidates ran for president, however ten of those were nuisance candidates.

Results

President

Vice president

Senate

House of Representatives

See also
Commission on Elections
Politics of the Philippines
Philippine elections
President of the Philippines
7th Congress of the Philippines

References

External links
 Official website of the Commission on Elections

1969
General election